Gurjari is an Indian classical music raga. Raga Gurjari is named after Gujarat, India. In south India, the raga is called Shekharachandrika.

Origin
The present day Gurjari raga owes its origin to the Gurjars (or Gujjars).

References

Hindustani ragas
Ragas in the Guru Granth Sahib
Gujarati music